Spreckels Building may refer to:

 Spreckels Building (Los Angeles), designated a Los Angeles Historic-Cultural Monument
 Spreckels Building, San Francisco, California
 Spreckels Theater Building, San Diego, California